Shaqaqi-ye Anzar (also Romanized as Shaqāqī-ye Anẕar and Shaqāqī Anẕar; also known as Shaqāq-e Anẕar) is a village in Chavarzaq Rural District, Chavarzaq District, Tarom County, Zanjan Province, Iran. At the 2006 census, its population was 317, in 72 families.

References 

Populated places in Tarom County